Charles Edward "Bronco" Seeling (14 May 1883 – 29 May 1956) was a New Zealand international rugby football player of the early 20th century. He played in the forwards for the original All Blacks, appearing in 11 tests including the famous "Match of the Century" against Wales.

Seeling then traveled to Great Britain armed with a 'letter of introduction' from a colleague. He signed with English rugby league club, Wigan in 1910. During the 1912–13 season Seeling played as a front-row forward and scored a try in Wigan's 21-5 victory over Rochdale Hornets in the 1912 Lancashire Cup Final at Weaste, Salford, on Wednesday 11 December 1912.

Seeling went on to make over 200 first grade appearances for the club over thirteen years, playing as captain for three of them. He scored 54 tries for Wigan and appeared in three consecutive championship finals. Noted British rugby writer, E. H. D. Sewell, wrote of Seeling: "Search where one may, a better forward than Seeling does not exist."

He spent the rest of his life in Britain, dying in 1956 at the age of 73 in a car accident.

In 1996 Seeling was inducted into the New Zealand Sports Hall of Fame as well as the international Rugby League Hall of Fame. In 2001 he was inducted as one of the NZRL Legends of League.
Seeling's son, Charlie Seeling Jr. also played rugby league, playing at club level for Warrington, becoming captain of Dewsbury, and playing at representative level for Dominion XIII. A shared benefit match for; Percy Coldrick, Charlie Seeling, and Frank Walford took place in April 1925.

References

Sources
Charlie Seeling at wiganwarriors.com

1883 births
1956 deaths
Auckland rugby union players
Footballers who switched code
New Zealand emigrants to the United Kingdom
New Zealand international rugby union players
New Zealand rugby league players
New Zealand rugby union players
Road incident deaths in England
Rugby league players from Whanganui
Rugby union players from Whanganui
Wigan Warriors players